The 1991 Supercopa de España comprised two-leg Spanish football matches played on 28 October and 11 November, 1991. It contested by Atlético Madrid, who were Spanish Cup winners in 1990–91, and Barcelona, who won the 1990–91 Spanish League. Barca won 2–1 on aggregate.

Match details

First leg

Second leg

References
 List of Super Cup Finals 1991 RSSSF.com

Supercopa de Espana Final
Supercopa de España
Supercopa de Espana 1991
Supercopa de Espana 1991